Vishnu Sena  is a 2005 Indian Kannada-language action drama film directed by Naganna and produced by M. Govinda. The film stars Vishnuvardhan along with Ramesh Aravind, Lakshmi Gopalaswamy and Gurleen Chopra in the prominent roles. The film had a musical score and soundtrack composed by Deva. The film is an unofficial Kannada remake of 2002 Tamil movie Ramanaa.

The film released  on 23 December 2005 to generally positive reviews from critics.

Summary
The film is the story of Prof. Jayasimha, who creates awareness among the public about corruption and his operation to curb the people who are responsible for the same.

Cast 
 Vishnuvardhan as Prof. Jayasimha
 Gurleen Chopra as Devaki, social worker 
 Lakshmi Gopalaswamy as Chitra, Jayasimha's wife 
 Niharika N as Priya, daughter of Prof. Jayasimha (Child Artist)
 Ramesh Aravind as Ramesh, police jeep driver 
 Ashutosh Rana as Badrinath
 Ananth Nag as Chief Minister 
 Pankaj Dheer as DCP Samarjith singh 
 Doddanna as Gangadharaiah
 Kishore
 Srinivasa Murthy as Judge
 Girija Lokesh
 M.N Lakshmi Devi
 B. Jaya
 Tennis Krishna
 Srinagar Kitty as Gopi, member in Vishnusena
 Sathyajith as Sathyajith, an officer
 Tharun Sudheer
 Hemanth G Nag
 Sandeep Singh
 Bangalore Nagesh
 M. S. Umesh
 Karthik Sharma

Soundtrack 
The music of the film was composed by Deva.

References 

2005 films
2000s Kannada-language films
Indian crime action films
2000s crime action films
Kannada remakes of Tamil films
Films about corruption in India
Films scored by Deva (composer)
Indian vigilante films
2000s vigilante films
Films directed by Naganna